Mohrite, (NH4)2Fe(SO4)2 · 6 H2O, is a rare ammonium iron(II) sulfate mineral originally found in the geothermal fields of Tuscany, Italy.  This Fe-dominant analogue of boussingaultite is sometimes reported from burning coal dumps where it is a product of pyrite oxidation.

The mineral crystallizes in the monoclinic crystal system with space group P21/a.

See also
 Mohr's salt
 Acid mine drainage, pyrite oxidation

References

Ammonium minerals
Iron(II) minerals
Sulfate minerals
Monoclinic minerals
Minerals in space group 14